Beur TV is a French television station mostly addressed to France's Maghrebi communities (Algerians, Moroccans and Tunisians). It is broadcast through cable and offered on ADSL.

The community-based television station was licensed through the Conseil supérieur de l'audiovisuel (CSA) in France on 8 January 2002. The chain started broadcasting on 1 April 2003, and was owned by Algerian-French Nacer Kettane, who was also owner of Beur FM radio station.

The chain developed partnerships with various Maghrebi media to cover important events in those countries, most notably ENTV (Algeria), RTM and 2M (Morocco) and ERTT (Tunisia).

In July 2011, and after the station suffered financial difficulties, Nacer Kettane sold 80% of the enterprise to VOXALGERIE. As a result, programming was more allied with Algerian ENTV output and Arab films. In December 2011, French-language shows returned, a new identifying logo designed and station identifying as Beur FM.tv.

The station is also broadcast on a free satellite channel on Hot Bird 6 at 13° East reaching all European Union member states, Arab league countries in the North Africa and Middle East.

Programming

Anime 
 Digimon
 Dragon Ball Z
 Hunter × Hunter
 The Jungle Book: The Adventures of Mowgli
 Little Women II: Jo's Boys
 Naruto: Shippuden
 Pokémon
 Slam Dunk
 Thunder Jet
 Tokyo Ghoul

See also 
 Beur FM

External links

 Official website 
 Official blog
 ENTV

Television stations in Algeria
Television stations in France
Arab-French culture
Arabic-language television stations
Berbers in France
Television channels and stations established in 2003